Hindustani, the lingua franca of Northern India and Pakistan, has two standardised registers: Hindi and Urdu. Grammatical differences between the two standards are minor but each uses its own script: Hindi uses Devanagari while Urdu uses an extended form of the Perso-Arabic script, typically in the Nastaʿlīq style.

Being "primarily a system of transliteration from the Indian scripts, [and] based in turn upon Sanskrit" (cf. IAST), these are its salient features: subscript dots for retroflex consonants; macrons for etymologically, contrastively long vowels; h for aspirated plosives; and tildes for nasalised vowels.

Phonology

The sounds presented in parenthesis in the tables below signify they are only found in loanwords from either Persian or Sanskrit. More information about phonology of Hindustani can be read on Hindustani phonology and IPA/Hindi and Urdu.

Vowels 
Hindustani natively possesses a symmetrical ten-vowel system. The vowels [ə], [ɪ], [ʊ] are always short in length, while the vowels [ɑː], [iː], [uː], [eː], [oː], [ɛː], [ɔː] are always considered long, in addition to an eleventh vowel /æː/ which is found in English loanwords.

Vowel  
Syncopation of phonemic middle schwa can further occur to give .

Consonants 
Hindustani has a core set of 28 consonants inherited from earlier Indo-Aryan. Supplementing these are two consonants that are internal developments in specific word-medial contexts, and seven consonants originally found in loan words, whose expression is dependent on factors such as status (class, education, etc.) and cultural register (Modern Standard Hindi vs Urdu).

The rule is that the consonant is pronounced as semivowel  in onglide position, i.e. between an onset consonant and a following vowel.

Consonants and vowels are outlined in the table below. Hovering the mouse cursor over them will reveal the appropriate IPA information, while in the rest of the article hovering the mouse cursor over  forms will reveal the appropriate English translation.

Morphology

Nouns
Hindustani distinguishes two genders (masculine and feminine), two noun types (count and non-count), two numbers (singular and plural), and three cases (nominative, oblique, and vocative). Nouns may be further divided into two classes based on declension, called type-I, type-II, and type-III. The basic difference between the two categories is that the former two have characteristic terminations in the nominative singular while the latter does not.

The table below displays the suffix paradigms. A hyphen symbol (for the marked type-I) denotes change from the original termination to another (for example laṛkā to laṛke in the masculine singular oblique), whereas a plus sign (for the unmarked type-II) denotes an ending which should be added (seb to sebõ in the masculine plural oblique). -Ø denotes that no suffix is added to the noun stem. The next table of noun declensions shows the above noun case paradigms in action.

Notesː 
 The semi-consonant -y- is added after the noun stem before adding the declension suffix in the plural declension when the noun stem ends in a vowel.
 A small number of marked masculine nouns like kuā̃ display nasalization of all terminations.
 Some masculine nouns (which refer to family relations) ending in -ā don't change in the nominative plural and fall in the unmarked category. i.e. pāpā "father", vālid "father", cācā "uncle", rājā "king".
 Unmarked nouns ending in -ū and -ī generally shorten this to -u and -i before the oblique (and vocative) plural terminations, with the latter also inserting the semivowel y.
 Many feminine Sanskrit loanwords such as bhāṣā ('language') and mātā (mother) end in -ā, therefore the ending -ā is not always a reliable indicator of noun gender.
 In Urdu, many Arabic words may retain their original dual and plural markings in Urdu. i.e. vālid "father" → vālidain "parents".
 The -iyā ending is also not always a reliable indicator of gender or noun type.Some words such as pahiyā ('wheel') and Persian takiyā ('pillow') are masculine type-I:  ('wheels'), takiye ('pillows').Feminine loanwords such as Arabic duniyā ('world') and Sanskrit kriyā ('action') use feminine type-II endings: duniyāẽ ('worlds'), kriyāẽ ('actions').
 Perso-Arabic loans ending in final unpronounced -h are handled as masculine marked nouns. Hence  → . The former is the Urdu spelling, the latter the Hindi.

Adjectives
Adjectives may be divided into declinable and indeclinable categories. Declinables are marked, through termination, for the gender, number, case of the nouns they qualify. The set of declinable adjective terminations is similar but greatly simplified in comparison to that of noun terminations. Indeclinable adjectives are completely invariable, and can end in either consonants or vowels (including ā and ī ). A number of declinables display nasalisation of all terminations. Nominative masculine singular form (-ā) is the citation form.

All adjectives can be used either attributively, predicatively, or substantively. Substantively they are declined as nouns rather than adjectives. The semblative postposition sā is used with adjectives for modifying or lightening their meaning; giving them an "-ish", "-esque", "like", or "quite" sense. e.g. nīlā "blue" → nīlā sā "bluish". Its emphasis is rather ambiguous, sometimes enhancing, sometimes toning down, the sense of the adjective.

 Examples of declinable (type-I) adjectives: baṛā "big", choṭā "small", acchā "good", burā "bad", kālā "black", ṭhanḍā "cold"..
 Examples of declinable (type-II) adjectives: dāyā̃ "right (direction)", bāyā̃ "left (direction)".
 Examples of indeclinable adjectives: xarāb "bad", sāf "clean", bhārī "heavy", murdā "dead", sundar "beautiful", pāgal "crazy/mad", lāl "red".

Comparatives and superlatives
Comparisons are made by using the instrumental postposition se (see below) the noun takes the oblique case and the combination of "noun + postposition" gets the instrumental case, and words like aur, zyādā ("more") and kam ("less") are added for relative comparisons. The word for "more" (zyādā) is optional, while "less" (kam) is required, so that in the absence of either, "more" will be inferred.

In the absence of an object of comparison the word for "more" is now no longer optional:

Superlatives are made through comparisons with sab ("all") with the instrumental postposition se as the suffix. Comparisons using "least" are rare; it is more common to use an antonym.

In Sanskritised and Persianised registers of Hindustani, comparative and superlative adjectival forms using suffixes derived from those languages can be found.

Numerals

The numeral systems of several of the Indo-Aryan languages, including Hindustani and Nepali, are typical decimal systems, but contracted to the extent that nearly every number 1–99 is irregular. The first four, and sixth, ordinal numbers are also irregular. The suffix -vā̃ marks ordinals five and seven onwards. The ordinals decline in the same way as the declinable adjectives. The suffix -gunā (translates as "times" as in multiplying) marks the multipliers which for the first three multipliers changes the numeral root. The collective forms of numerals take the same form as the oblique plural case for masculine nouns. They are formed by adding the suffix -õ''. There are two types of adverbials. The first type is formed using the suffix -bārā but only for the numerals 2, 3, and 4 (but it's rarely used for 3 and even more rarely for 4). The second type of adverbial is constructed periphrastically using the quantifier bār meaning "times" (as in turns). The adverbial "dobārā" could be translated as "again" or "for a second time", similarly "tibārā" and "caubārā" mean "for a third time" and "for a fourth time" respectively. However, the periphrasatic adverbial constructions "do bār", "tīn bār" etc. translate as "two times", "three times" etc. respectively.

H = Hindi; U = Urdu

Postpositions
The aforementioned inflectional case system only goes so far on its own, and rather serves as that upon which is built a system of agglutinative suffixes or particles known as postpositions, which parallel English's prepositions. It is their use with a noun or verb that necessitates the noun or verb taking the oblique case (though the bare oblique is also sometimes used adverbially), and it is with them that the locus of grammatical function or "case-marking" then lies. There are eight such "one-word" primary case-marking postpositions.

Primary postpositions 

 Out of these 8 postpositions, the genitive and semblative postpositions kā & sā decline to agree with the gender, number, and case of the object it shows possession of and the object whose semblance is described.
 For some verbs like bolnā (to speak/say), the speaker can use both the instrumental marker se and the accusative/dative marker ko. For example, rāhul se bolo and rāhul ko bolo both translate to the same "Say it to Rahul.". However, the nuance  expressed by both are different, instrumental marker se has a softer tone to it. rāhul se bolo is more like a suggestion in form of an imperative while rāhul ko bolo is an order.
 Beyond the list above, there are a large range of compound postpositions, constructed majoritarily from the genitive marker kā (in its oblique cases ke & kī) plus an adverb. When using with pronouns, these all the compound postpositions can only be used with the genitive oblique case pronouns and the genitive kī/ke must be omitted before attaching them with the genitive oblique case.

Secondary postpositions 

Some compound postpositions do not have the genitive marker as their primary postposition, such as:

Tertiary postpositions 
Some other compound postpositions with two secondary postpositions (called tertiary postposition) can be constructed by adding primary postpositions to some of the compound postpositions shown above.

Pronouns

Personal and non-personal pronouns
Hindustani has personal pronouns for the first and second persons, while for the third person demonstratives are used, which can be categorised deictically as proximate and non-proximate. tū, tum, and āp are the three 2P pronouns, constituting a threefold scale of sociolinguistic formality: respectively, intimate, familiar, and formal. The 2P intimate conjugations are grammatically singular while the 2P familiar and formal conjugations are grammatically plural. For the non-personal pronouns (demonstrative, relative, and interrogative) the plural forms are also the formal forms. Pronouns in Hindustani do not distinguish gender however they distinguish the nominative, oblique, and the common accusative/dative grammatical cases. The latter-most, often called a set of contracted forms, is used synonymously with the dative/accusative pronoun constructed from the oblique case by suffixing the dative/accusative postposition ko. So, for e.g., mujhe and mujhko are synonymous dative/accusative pronouns. 

The 1P and 2P pronouns (except the formal 2P pronoun āp) have their own distinctive genitive forms merā, hamārā, terā, & tumhārā unlike the non-personal pronouns whose genitive forms are constructed employing the oblique case pronoun to which the genitive postposition kā is suffixed (OBL. + kā). The personal pronouns (except the formal 2P āp) colloquially can also take the genitive oblique case before primary postpositions. So, instead of mujhe or mujhko, the periphrastic construction mere ko is fairly commonly heard as a synonym to mujhe/mujhko in colloquial speech.

To construct the ergative case pronouns, the ergative postposition ne is suffixed to the nominative case forms rather than the oblique case forms for the personal pronouns, while the demonstrative, relative, and interrogative pronouns have unique ergative oblique case forms to which ne gets suffixed. So, rather than *mujh-ne and *tujh-ne, it's maĩ-ne and tū-ne, and for the non-personal pronouns (e.g., for demonstrative plural) it's inhõ-ne and unhõ-ne. The 1P plural and the 2P familiar pronouns also have an emphatic ergative case form which respectively are hamī̃ne and tumhī̃ne which are derived using the exclusive emphatic particle hī as ham + hī + ne and tum + hī + ne. For the rest of the personal pronouns, the inclusive emphatic particle hī must come after the pronoun in ergative case and never between the pronoun and the postposition ne. So, rather than *maĩ-hī-ne, it's periphrastically constructed as maĩne hī. As for the non-personal pronouns, both ways of constructing the emphatic forms are grammatically valid. So, for e.g. the demonstrative proximal singular emphatic pronoun isīne and isne hī are synonymous. The emphatic forms for the relative pronouns are constructed periphrastically as well, but they instead use the inclusive emphatic particle bhī. So, the emphatic form of the relative singular ergative pronoun jisne is jisne bhī  meaning "whoever" and not *jis-bhī-ne, which not a valid construction.

Compound postpositions must be used with the genitive oblique cases when using them with the personal pronouns (except the 2P formal āp). So, when using the compound postposition ke andar – "inside", *mujh-ke andar and *mujh andar are grammatically invalid constructions and instead it should be mere andar – "inside me". The compound postpositions that have the primary postposition kī in place of kā must have the genitive oblique case declined to the feminine gender. So, when using the postposition kī taraf  – "towards", it should be merī taraf and not *mere taraf.

Note
 Postpositions are treated as bound morphemes after pronouns in Hindi, but as separate words in Urdu.
 The varying forms for the demonstrative nominative case pronouns constitute one of the small number of grammatical differences between Hindi and Urdu. In Hindi, yah "this" / ye "these" / vah "that" / ve "those" are considered the literary pronoun set while in Urdu, ye "this, these" / vo "that, those" is the only pronoun set.
 The above section on postpositions noted that ko (the dative/accusative case) marks direct objects if definite. As "the most specific thing of all is an individual", persons (or their pronouns) nearly always take the dative case or postposition.
 It is very common practice to use plural pronouns (and their accompanying conjugation) in formal situations, thus tum can be used in the second person when referring to one person. Similarly, some speakers prefer plural ham over singular maĩ. This is usually not quite the same as the "royal we"; it is rather colloquial.

Reflexive pronouns 
apnā is a (genitive) reflexive pronoun: "my/your/etc. (own)". Using non-reflexive and reflexive together gives emphasis; e.g. merā apnā "my (very) own". xud, āp, and svayam are some (nominative; non-genitive) others: "my/your/etc.-self". Bases for oblique usage are usually apne (self) or apne āp (automatically). The latter alone can also mean "of one's own accord"; āpas mẽ means "among/between oneselves".

Indefinite quantifier pronouns 
koī and kuch are indefinite pronouns/quantifiers. As pronouns, koī is used for animate singular ("someone") and kuch for animate plural and inanimates ("something"). As quantifiers/adjectives koī is used for singular count nouns and kuch for mass nouns and plural count nouns. koī takes the form kisī in the oblique. The form kaī is a paucal equivalent to koī, being used in the context of "several" or "a few" things. kuch can also act as an adverb, qualifying an adjective, meaning "rather". koī preceding a number takes the meaning of "about, approximately". In this usage it does not oblique to kisī.

Adverbial pronouns

Note:

 The feminine plural forms are commonly used as singular respect forms and the feminine singular forms often are used interchangeably with the feminine plural forms.
 The declension pattern followed is the same as how genitive pronouns and postpositions decline.

Emphatic pronouns 
Emphatic pronouns of Hindustani are formed by combining the exclusive emphatic particle hī or the inclusive emphatic particle bhī (with the interrogatory and relative pronouns respectively) and the pronoun in their regular oblique and nominative case. Usually, combining the emphatic particles and the pronouns with end with the consonant -h form a new set of emphatic nominative case and emphatic oblique case pronouns. The rest of the pronouns can also be combined with the exclusive emphatic particle but they do not form true pronouns, but simply add the emphatic particle as an adposition after them. The Relative and Interrogatory pronouns can only take the inclusive emphatic particle bhī as an adposition and never the exclusive emphatic particle hī.

Adverbs
Hindustani has few underived forms. Adverbs may be derived in ways such as the following —

 Simply obliquing some nouns and adjectives:
 nīcā "low" → nīce "down"
 sīdhā "straight" → sīdhe "straight"
 dhīrā "slow" → dhīre "slowly"
 saverā "morning" → savere "in the morning"
 ye taraf  "this direction" → is taraf  "in this direction/this way"
 kolkātā "Calcutta" → kolkāte "to Calcutta".
 Nouns using the instrumental marker se "by, with, -ly":
 zor "force" → zor se "forcefully" (lit. "with force")
 dhyān "attention" → dhyān se "attentively" (lit. "with attention")
 Adjectives using post-positional phrases involving "way, manner":
 acchā "good" → acche se "well" (lit. "by/in a good way")
 xās "special" → xās taur pe "especially" (lit. "on a special way")
 Verbs in conjunctive form:
 hãs "laugh" → hãske "laughingly" (lit. "having laughed")
 meherbānī kar "do kindness" → meherbānī karke "kindly, please" (lit. "having done kindness")
 Formative suffixes from Sanskrit or Perso-Arabic in higher registers of Hindi or Urdu
 Skt. sambhava "possible" +  →  "possibly".
 Ara. ittifāq "chance" + -an → ittifāqan "by chance", "coincidentally".

Verbs

Overview
The Hindustani verbal system is largely structured around a combination of aspect and tense/mood. Like the nominal system, the Hindustani verb involves successive layers of (inflectional) elements to the right of the lexical base.

Hindustani has 3 aspects: perfective, habitual, and progressive, each having overt morphological correlates. These are participle forms, inflecting for gender and number by way of a vowel termination, like adjectives. The perfective, though displaying a "number of irregularities and morphophonemic adjustments", is the simplest, being just the verb stem followed by the agreement vowel. The habitual forms from the imperfective participle; verb stem, plus -t-, then vowel. The continuous forms periphrastically through compounding (see below) with the perfective of rahnā "to stay".

The copula honā "to be" can be put into five grammatical moods: indicative, presumptive, subjunctive, contrafactual and, imperative. Used both in basic predicative/existential sentences and as verbal auxiliaries to aspectual forms, these constitute the basis of tense and mood.

Non-aspectual forms include the infinitive, the imperative, and the conjunctive. Mentioned morphological conditions such as the subjunctive, "presumptive", etc. are applicable to both copula roots for auxiliary usage with aspectual forms and to non-copula roots directly for often unspecified (non-aspectual) finite forms.

Finite verbal agreement is with the nominative subject, except in the transitive perfective, where it is with the direct object, with the erstwhile subject taking the ergative construction -ne (see postpositions above). The perfective aspect thus displays split ergativity.

Tabled below on the left are the paradigms for adjectival concord (A), here only slightly different from that introduced previously: the f. pl. can nasalise under certain conditions. To the right are the paradigms for personal concord (P), used by the subjunctive.

Copula in Hindustani
All the verbs in Hindustani except the verb honā (to be) are defective and cannot be conjugated into these following moods and tenses in their non-aspectual forms (or simple aspect):

 present indicative
 imperfect indicative
 presumptive mood
 present subjunctive

The verb honā (to be) serves as the copula whose conjugations are used to form the three aspectual (or compound) forms of verbs (habitual, perfective, and progressive). In the tables below all the conjugations of the copula honā (to be) are shown on the left and all the conjugations of the verb karnā (to do) (like which all other verbs have conjugations) are shown on the right.

1 the pronouns tum and āp can be used in both singular and plural sense by adding plural indicator words like sab (all) and log (people), akin to the English pronouns you and y'all.

2 the contrafactual mood serves as both the past subjunctive and the past conditional mood.

Compound tenses
Periphrastic Hindustani verb forms consist of two elements. The first of these two elements is the aspect marker. The second element (the copula) is the common tense-mood marker.

Mood & aspects
Hindustani has three aspects, Habitual aspect, Perfective Aspect and the Progressive Aspect. To construct the progressive aspect and forms, Hindustani makes use of the progressive participle rahā which is derived from the verb rahnā ("to stay" or "to remain"). Unlike English and many other Indo-European languages, Hindustani does differentiate between Continuous and the Progressive aspects. So, for e.g. the sentence "maĩ śarṭ pahan rahā hū̃" will always translate as "I am (in the process) of wearing a shirt." and it can never be used to mean "I am (already) wearing a shirt.". In English, however, "I am wearing a shirt." can be used to mean both the idea of progressive action and a continuous action. To convey the continuous state of an action the perfective adjectival participle is employed. So, "I am (already) wearing a shirt." translates into Hindustani as "maĩ śarṭ pahnā huā hū̃." All the personal compound forms of the verb karnā (to do) in all three aspects and all the grammatical moods are shown in the table below:
{|
|

|-
|1 the pronouns tum and āp can be used in both singular and plural sense, akin to the English pronoun you.
|-
|2 the habitual aspect of Hindustani cannot be put into future tense.
|-
|3 the perfective aspect behaves ergatively, agreeing with the object of the sentence. However, if the object is marked with the postposition ko, the noun is placed in the third-person masculine singular. As personal object pronouns are always marked with ko, there are no personal perfective forms.
|-
|4 unlike English in which both the continuous and the progressive aspect have the same forms, the progressive aspect of Hindustani cannot convey the continuous aspect.|}

Different copulas
The habitual, progressive, and imperfect aspectual participles can be used with copulas other than honā (to be) such as rahnā (to stay), ānā (to come), jānā (to go). These copulas can be converted into their participle forms and can be conjugated to form personal compound aspectual forms. Each of the four copulas provides a unique nuance to the aspect.

Participles
The participle forms of any verb is constructed by adding suffixes to the verb root. The participle forms of the verb karnā (to do) are shown in the tables below:

Verb forms
A summary of all verb forms is given in the tables below. The sample verb is intransitive dauṛnā "to run", and the sample inflection is 3rd. masc. sg. (P = e, A = ā) where applicable.

Notes
The future tense is formed by adding the suffix gā (~ ge ~ gī) to the subjunctive, which is a contraction of gaā (= gayā, perfective participle of jānā "to go"). The future suffix, conjunctive participle, and suffix vālā are treated as bound morphemes in written Hindi, but as separate words in written Urdu.
The present copula seems not to follow along the lines of the regular P system of terminations; while the subjunctive copula is thoroughly irregular. So here are all of their forms.
For the 1. subj. sg. copula  and  list hū̃ while  lists hoū̃.
 lists the formal imperative ending as -iye, while  lists it as -ie but -iye after ā, o, ū.
The euphonic glide y is inserted in perfective participles between prohibited vowel clusters. It is historically the remnant of the old perfective marker. The clusters are a + ā, ā + ā, o + ā, and ī + ā, resulting in āyā, ayā, oyā, iyā. e.g. khāyā/khāye/khāyī/khāyī̃ (khā- "eat").
In addition, the combinations ī + ī and i + ī give ī. e.g. piyā/piye/pī/pī̃ (pī- "drink").
As stated, agreement in the transitive perfective is with the direct object, with the erstwhile subject taking the ergative postposition ne. If however the direct object takes the postposition ko (marking definiteness), or if no direct object is expressed, then agreement neutralises to default m. sg. -ā.
In this regard, there are a small number of verbs that while perhaps logically transitive still do not take ne and continue to agree with the subject, in the perfective. e.g. lānā "to bring", bhūlnā "to forget", milnā "to meet", etc.

Besides supplying the copulas, honā "to be" can be used aspectually: huā "happened, became"; hotā "happens, becomes, is"; ho rahā "happening, being".-ke can be used as a colloquial alternative to -kar for the conjunctive participle of any verb.
Hindustani displays a very small number of irregular forms, spelled out in the cells below. Historically, there were many more irregular forms (e.g. muā for marnā 'to die') but most have been regularised. Notably, some dialects regularise the perfective of karnā to karā and the formal imperative of kijiye to kariye.

 The irregular forms are underlined in the above table.
 There are two subjunctive stems for the verb honā, one being regular and the other being irregular. The regular set is the future subjunctive forms and the regular ones are the as the present subjunctive forms. honā is the only verb in Hindi to have distinct forms for the future and the present subjunctive, for all other forms there is one common subjunctive form which is used as both the present and the future subjunctive.
However, it is jā- that is used as the perfective stem in the rare instance of an intransitive verb like jānā being expressed passively, such as in a passivized imperative/subjunctive construction: ghar jāyā jāye? "Shall [we] go home?" (lit. "Shall home be gone to [by us]?").

Set of related verbs
Transitives are morphologically contrastive in Hindustani, leading to the existence of related verb sets divisible along such lines. While the derivation of such forms shows patterns, they do reach a level of variegation so as to make it somewhat difficult to outline all-encompassing rules. Furthermore, some sets may have as many as four to five distinct members; also, the meaning of certain members of given sets may be idiosyncratic. 

These below are the verb forms that a verb in Hindi can have —

 Intransitive
 Involitional  — these are actions that cannot be done intentionally.
 Dative — these involitional verbs require the subject to be in the dative case.
 Non-dative — these verbs require the verb to be in the nominative case.
 Volitional — these are actions that can be intentionally done.
 Ergative — these verbs can take in the ergative case (the subject can be in the ergative case).
 Non-ergative — these verbs cannot take in the ergative case (the subject can only be in the nominative case).
 Transitive
 Direct — the subject themselves experiences the action but the subject and the object are not the same
 Indirect — the subject imparts the action onto the object, the object is the experiencer of the action, it is usually translated into English as "to make (someone/something) verb"
 Reflexive —  the verb does action on the subject itself, the doer and experiencer of the action is the same subject
 Causative — the subject causes the action to happen. Translationː "to cause to be verbed", the agent takes the instrumental postposition se. Thus Y se Z banvānā = "to cause Z to be made by Y" = "to cause Y to make Z" = "to have Z made by Y" = "to have Y make Z", etc.

Starting from direct transitive verb forms, the other verb stems i.e., intransitive, causative, reflexive, indirect stems are produced according to these following (not exhaustive) assorted rulesSnell & Weightman (1989ː pg. 243–244) —

 Root vowel changeː
 a → ā u / ū → o i / ī → e Sometimes the root vowel change accompanies the root's final consonant changeː
 k → c ṭ → r̥ l → Ø Suffixation of -ā to form the indirect or reflexive formː
 Root vowel changeː ū/o → u; e/ai/ā/ī → i Insertion of semivowel l between such vowel-terminating stems
 Suffixation of -vā (in place of -ā where it would occur) to form the causative verb stem

Light verbs

Compound verbs, a highly visible feature of Hindi–Urdu grammar, consist of a verbal stem plus a light verb. The light verb (also called "subsidiary", "explicator verb", and "vector") loses its own independent meaning and instead "lends a certain shade of meaning" to the main or stem verb, which "comprises the lexical core of the compound". While almost any verb can act as a main verb, there is a limited set of productive light verbs. Shown below are prominent such light verbs, with their independent meaning first outlined, followed by their semantic contribution as auxiliaries. Finally, having to do with the manner of an occurrence, compounds verbs are mostly used with completed actions and imperatives, and much less with negatives, conjunctives, and contexts continuous or speculative. This is because non-occurrences cannot be described to have occurred in a particular manner. The auxiliaries when combined with the main verb provides an aspectual sense to the main verb it modifies. Light verbs such as jānā "to go", ānā "to come", cuknā when combined with the main verb give the formed compound verb a perfective aspect, while retaining the original meaning of the main verb.

The first three light verbs in the above table are the most common of auxiliaries, and the "least marked", or "lexically nearly colourless". The nuance conveyed by an auxiliary can often be very subtle, and need not always be expressed with different words in English translation. lenā and denā, transitive verbs, occur with transitives, while intransitive jānā occurs mostly with intransitives; a compound of a transitive and jānā will be grammatically intransitive as jānā is.

Finally, having to do with the manner of an occurrence, compounds verbs are mostly used with completed actions and imperatives, and much less with negatives, conjunctives, and contexts continuous or speculative. This is because non-occurrences cannot be described to have occurred in a particular manner.

Conjuncts
Another notable aspect of Hindi–Urdu grammar is that of "conjunct verbs", composed of a noun or adjective paired up with a general verbaliser, most commonly transitive karnā "to do" or intransitive honā "to be", "to happen", functioning in the place of what in English would be single unified verb. All conjunct verbs formed using karnā are transitive verbs and all conjunct verbs formed using the verb honā are intransitive verbs.

In the case of an adjective as the non-verbal element, it is often helps to think of karnā "to do" as supplementarily having the senses of "to cause to be", "to make", "to render", etc.

In the case of a noun as the non-verbal element, it is treated syntactically as the verb's (direct) object (never taking the ko marker; governing agreement in perfective and infinitival constructions), and the semantic patient (or agent: see gālī khānā below) of the conjunct verbal expression is often expressed/marked syntactically as a genitive postposition (-kā ~ ke ~ kī) of the noun.

With English it is the verb stems themselves that are used. All English loan words are used by forming compound verbs in Hindi by using either honā (intransitive) or karnā (transitive).

Passive
The passive construction is periphrastic. It is formed from the perfective participle by addition of the auxiliary jānā "to go"; i.e. likhnā "to write" → likhā jānā "to be written". The agent is marked by the instrumental postposition se. Furthermore, both intransitive and transitive verbs may be grammatically passivized to show physical/psychological incapacity, usually in negative sentences. Lastly, intransitives often have a passive sense, or convey unintentional action.

Syntax

 Word order 
Hindustani is a word order free language, in the sense that word order does not usually signal grammatical functions in the language. However, the unmarked word order in Hindustani is SOV. It is neither purely left- nor right-branching, and phenomena of both types can be found. The order of constituents in sentences as a whole lacks governing "hard and fast rules", and frequent deviations can be found from normative word position, describable in terms of a small number of rules, accounting for facts beyond the pale of the label of "SOV".

 Subject precedes the direct object of the sentence if both the dative and the accusative case marks the objects of a sentence. Prescriptively, the relative position is fixed in order to make it unambiguous which is the direct object and which is the indirect object in the sentence as both the dative case and the accusative case is the same in Hindustani and are marked by the same postposition ko.
 Attributive adjectives precede the noun they qualify by default, but can also be placed after the noun, doing that usually makes the sentence sound either more poetic or gives as stronger emphasises on the attribute that the adjective describes.
 Adverbs usually can appear either before or after the verb they qualify.
 Negative markers (nahī̃, na, mat) and interrogatives precede the verb by default but can also appear after it, however the position for negation can be more flexible and the negation can occur before or after the auxiliary verbs too if the sentence has an auxiliary verb. Whenever the negation comes after the verbs instead of before the verb, it always emphasises the negation. The negation can never come before a noun.
 kyā ("what?") as the yes-no question marker occurs at the beginning or the end of a clause as its unmarked positions but it can be put anywhere in the sentence except before a verb, where it is instead interpreted as the its interrogative meaning "what". This is frequently dropped in colloquial conversation, and instead, the last word of the question has a higher pitch.

In the example below, it is shown that all word orders make sense for simple sentences, which do not have adjectives, negations and adverbs. As a general rule, whatever information comes first in the sentence gets emphasised and the information which appears at the end of a sentence gets emphasised the least.

As long as both dative and the accusative case are not used in the sentence, the word order flexibility remains. For example, in the table below the locative and the accusative case is used in the same sentence, the word order is flexible because the markers for the locative and the accusative cases are different but in Hindustani, the marker for the accusative and the dative case are the same, which is ko for nouns and the oblique case pronouns or they have their own unique pronoun forms which are the same for dative and the accusative case.
Usage of dative/accusative noun + accusative/dative pronoun

When noun and pronoun are used together in a sentence and one is in accusative case while the other is in the dative case, there is no way to differentiate which one is which just by looking at the sentence. Usually in such cases, owing to the default word order of Hindi (which is SOV) which noun/pronoun comes earlier in the sentence becomes the subject of the sentence and what comes later becomes the object of the sentence.
Usage of dative noun + accusative noun

Nouns in Hindi are put in the dative or accusative case first having the noun in the oblique case and then by adding the postposition ko after it. However, when two nouns are used in a sentence in which one of them is in the accusative case and the other in the dative case, the sentence becomes ambiguous and stops making sense, so, to make sense of the sentence, one of the noun (which is assumed to be in the accusative case) is put into the nominative case and the other one is left as it is (in the dative case). The noun which is put into the nominative case becomes the direct object of the sentence and the other one (which is now in the Accusative case) becomes the indirect object of the sentence.

When both the nouns use the ko marker, generally, all permutations in which the nouns with the same case marker are adjacent to one another become ambiguous or convey no sense.

Removing the ko from the word sā̃p leaves it in the nominative case. Now, it acts as the direct object of the sentence and saperā becomes the indirect object of the sentence. The English translation becomes "Give the snake-charmer a snake." and when the opposite is done, the English translation of the sentence becomes "Give the snake a snake-charmer." 

Usage of dative pronoun + accusative pronoun

When two pronouns are used in a sentence, all the sentences remain grammatically valid but the ambiguity of precisely telling the subject and the object of the sentence remains. However, just as we did above, converting one the pronoun into nominative case does not work for all pronouns but only for the 3rd person pronouns and doing that for any other pronoun will leave the sentence ungrammatical and without sense. The reason that this works only for the 3rd person pronoun because these are not really the "regular" 3rd person pronouns but are instead the demonstrative pronouns. Hindustani lacks the regular 3rd person pronouns and hence compensates for them by using the demonstrative pronouns.

So, the ambiguity cannot completely be removed in this case here, unless of course it is interpreted that what comes first becomes the subject of the sentence. The English translation becomes either "Give me to that/him/her/it." or "Give me that/him/her/it." depending on which pronoun appears first in the sentence.

Possession
Unlike English and many other Indo-European languages, Hindustani doesn't have a verb which uniquely translate to "to have" of English. Possession is reflected in Hindustani by the genitive marker kā (inflected appropriately) or the postposition ke pās ("near") and the verb honā. Possible objects of possession fall into the following four main categories in Hindustani,

 Fundamental possessions: These are possessions that are of permanent nature, which one has not obtained but got naturally and cannot be owned. These include, family relations, body parts, etc.
For indicating fundamental possessions, kā appears after the subject of the possession. With personal pronouns, this requires the use of the possessive pronoun (inflected appropriately).
 Non-Fundamental possessions: These are possessions that one has obtained or can be owned. These include possession of any object, living beings (including humans), etc.
For indicating non-fundamental possessions, the compound postposition ke pās (literally, "of near") is used. However, this postposition cannot ever be translated as "near", showing proximity.
 Proximal possessions: These are possessions that show that someone or something has something near themselves.
For indicating proximity of the object to the subject, the double compound postposition ke pās mẽ (literally, "of near in") is used. It translates as "nearby".
Dative/Abstract possessions: These are abstract possessions such as pain, problems, issue, wanting, happiness, etc. but sometimes it can also be used to show number of children one has (gave birth to and not adopted).
For indicating dative possessions, the pronouns in their dative case or the dative postposition ko is used.

Note: The verb honā can be translated as "to be", "to have/possess", "to exist" or "to happen" depending on the context. The third person singular and plural conjugations depending on the context could also be translated as "there is" and "there are" respectively.

Note: Sometimes when talking about physical objects (including animals) both the fundamental and non-fundamental possessions are used interchangeably when the meaning conveyed in both cases doesn't lead to confusion. For example, mere do kutte haĩ and mere pās do kutte haĩ (both translating as, "I have two dogs.") are often used interchangeably when referring to pet dogs, with the sentence with the fundamental possession showing or having more emotional attachment. The reason these both are used interchangeably because it is a priori understood that the dogs in the context must be pet dogs. Same happens with the second example above on both the tables conveying the possession of eyes; it is understood that the eyes in the context are one's own. In the contexts where such a priori information is not immediately understood, these two types of possessions cannot be used interchangeably.

Relativisation
Rather than using relative clauses after nouns, as in English, Hindustani uses correlative clauses. In Hindustani, a correlative clause can go before or after the entire clause, the adjective, the noun, the pronoun or the verb it relativises.

Note: The relative pronoun jo can be used as both relative "what" and relative "who".

Case-marking and verb agreement
Hindustani has tripartite case-marking, which means that the subject in intransitive clauses, and the agent and the object in transitive clauses each can be marked by a distinct case form. The full set of case distinctions is however only realized in certain clause types.

In intransitive clauses, the subject is in nominative case. The verb displays agreement with the subject: depending on aspect and mood, the verb agrees in gender and number, and/or person and number.

In transitive clauses, there are three patterns:

1. Perfective clauses with animate/definite object
Fully distinctive case marking is found in perfective clauses with animate and/or definite objects. Here, the agent takes the ergative case marker ne, while the object takes the accusative case marker ko. The verb does not agree with either of the core arguments (agent and object), but is marked per default as third person masculine singular (calāyā hai).

2. Perfective clauses with inanimate/indefinite object
In perfective clauses with an indefinite object, the agent keeps the ergative case marker, but the object is in nominative case. The verb agrees with the object: the perfective form calāyī hai is marked for feminine gender, agreeing with the gender of the object gāṛī.

3. Non-perfective clauses
In all other clause types, the agent is in nominative case and triggers agreement on the verb. The object is either in nominative case or accusative case, depending on animacy/definiteness

The following table summarises the three basic case-marking and agreement types.

Differential argument marking

Hindustani, like other Indo-Aryan languages, displays differential case marking on both subjects (DSM) and objects (DOM). Diachronically, differential argument marking developed very differently for subjects and objects, but for both became prevalent in the 17th century. For subjects, it is predicate-licensed and dependent on semantics, whereas for objects it is discourse-driven.

For subjects, on top of the previously discussed split ergativity (in which perfective case verbs take the ergative ne on the subject, while other conjugations have an unmarked subject), certain modal auxiliary verbs take different case markers for their subjects.

The most notable instance of DSM is the experiencer dative subject (a type of quirky subject). Verbs indicating sensations (lagnā "to seem"), emotions (mahsūs honā "to feel"), and cognition (patā honā "to be known"), all license the dative case marker ko on their subjects. This is a cross-lingual phenomenon.

Passive subjects taking the modal auxiliary jānā 'to go', usually connoting reduced agentivity, take the instrumental se. This construction can also be used to indicate ability.

The dative ko indicates obligation or necessity. The modal honā 'to be' and paṛnā 'to fall' both take this on their subjects.

The accusative marker ko is only applied when the object is definite, similar to the distinction between the and a(n)'' in English.

Notes

See also 

 Urdu language
 Hindi language
 Hindi verbs
 Hindi pronouns
 Urdu alphabet
 Devanagari
 Devanagari transliteration
 Hindustani phonology

References

Bibliography
.
.
.
.
.

Further reading

 (public domain e-book) Contributed by University of California libraries

ABBR1:meaning1
ABBR2:meaning2

Indo-Aryan grammars
Hindustani language
Hindi
Urdu